Gemcon Group is a Bangladeshi diversified conglomerate based in Dhaka.

History 
Gemcon Group was established in 1979 through Castle Construction. It was founded by Kazi Shahid Ahmed who is also the chairperson of the group. It is a family owned company. Ahmed's three sons are directors of the company, Kazi Anis Ahmed, Kazi Inam Ahmed, and Kazi Nabil Ahmed.

Gemcon group has provides awards for writers and poets that it gives annually. It started as Kagoj Tarun Sahitya Puraskar. In 2003, the award was renamed to Best Book Award. It was renamed against in 2007 Gemcon Sahitya Puroshkar.

Gemcon Group owned Ajker Kagoj. It closed the newspaper with a one-day notice to its employees. Kazi Anis Ahmed is the publisher of Dhaka Tribune and Bangla Tribune.

In January 2020, Gemcon announced it is in talks to acquire Agora Super Stores and merge it with Meena Bazar. The merger would make Meena Bazar the biggest retail chain in Bangladesh. Gemcon Khulna won the Bangabandhu T20 Cup in December 2020.

Businesses 

 Castle Construction
 Gemcon Limited
 Charka Steel Limited
 Kazi & Kazi Tea Estate sells Teatulia branded tea; the first organic tea in Bangladesh. The plantation is located in Panchagarh District. 
 Gemcon Food & Agricultural Products Limited (Meena Bazar)
 Meena Click(an online grocery shop)
 Meena Sweets
 Gemcon City Limited
 Gem Jute
 Gemini Sea Food
 Organikare
 University of Liberal Arts Bangladesh
 Kazi Shahid Foundation
 Abahani Limited Dhaka
 Gemcon Khulna
Meena Bazar, Super Store.

See also 
 East Coast Group

References 

1979 establishments in Bangladesh
Organisations based in Dhaka
Conglomerate companies of Bangladesh